Ovid or Ovidius (43 BC–17 AD) was a Roman poet. His name is used as a male first name, especially in Romance languages, often in variations such as Ovidi, Ovídio, Ovidio, or Ouvidu, and in some recent usage shortened to Ovi. It may refer to:

Places

United States
 Ovid, Colorado
 Ovid, Idaho
 Ovid, Michigan, a village in Clinton County, Michigan
 Ovid Township, Branch County, Michigan
 Ovid Township, Clinton County, Michigan
 Ovid, Missouri
 Ovid (town), New York
 Ovid (village), New York

Elsewhere
 Ovidiu, Romania
 Ovidiopol, Ukraine

Persons

Saint
 Saint Ovidius, a Portuguese saint

Surname
 Juventinus Albius Ovidius, a Roman poet, probably of the late 2nd century

Given name
 Ovid Densusianu, a Romanian poet
 Ovidi Montllor, a Valencian singer-songwriter and actor
 Ovidio Assonitis, an Egyptian film producer
 Ovidiu Burcă, a Romanian soccer footballer
 Ovidiu Cernăuţeanu (aka Ovidiu Jacobsen, Ovi Martin), a Romanian-Norwegian singer
 Ovidiu Herea, a Romanian footballer
 Ovidiu Petre, a Romanian soccer footballer
 Ovidiu Stângă, a Romanian footballer and manager
 Ovidiu Toniţa, a Romanian rugby footballer

Other 
 Ovid Technologies, vendor of online bibliographic databases and academic journals, chiefly in health sciences
 Ovid Napa Valley - a winery in Napa Valley, California
 Ovid (crater) - a crater on Mercury